Kalitinka is a rural locality (a village) in Kargopolsky District, Arkhangelsk Oblast, Russia. The population was 81 as of 2012.

Geography 
Kalitinka is located 17 km south of Kargopol (the district's administrative centre) by road. Polupopovka is the nearest rural locality.

References 

Rural localities in Kargopolsky District